Jersey City was an American soccer club based in Jersey City, New Jersey that was briefly a member of the professional American Soccer League. They joined for the second half of the 1928/29 season, but folded after only seven games.  Their final game on February 10, 1929, was a 4-2 loss to Providence, at which point they 4 points from 2 wins, 5 losses, and no draws.

Year-by-year

References 

Defunct soccer clubs in New Jersey
American Soccer League (1921–1933) teams
Sports in Hudson County, New Jersey
1929 disestablishments in New Jersey
Association football clubs disestablished in 1929